Architecture Worth Saving in Onondaga County is a 1964 book that surveyed buildings across Onondaga County, New York, and discussed their historical value. Undertaken by the New York State Council on the Arts, and compiled by a group of professors at the Syracuse University School of Architecture, the book was initially well received by historians and architects who hoped the book would be the first of several profiling buildings with historic and architectural value around the United States. However, the book was out of print by 1975, and many of the buildings listed had been destroyed.

Writing and publication 
The New York State Council on the Arts developed Architecture Worth Saving in Onondaga County in the early 1960s. It was created as a "pilot project", and the Council intended that similar studies would be conducted in other places. William Hull, assistant director of the Council, started the project, while the Syracuse University School of Architecture led by Harley J. McKee carried it out. Other architects at the school involved in writing the book were Patricia Day Earle, Paul Malo, and Peter Andrews. A forward was written by John H. MacFayden. Most of the photographs included were taken by Gilbert Ask.

Content 
The book includes descriptions of 64 buildings across 206 pages. They considered buildings for their "architectural merit, unisequences of style, representation of period and historical value," with a focus on commercial buildings in the downtown area, which were considered to be at the greatest risk for destruction. Architecture Worth Saving also offered suggestions on how to save the architecture, including ways to re-purpose old buildings. Buildings listed included:

 John Gridley House
 Gen. Orrin Hutchinson House
 Dr. John Ives House
 Delphi Baptist Church
 Small Jewett House
 Whig Hill
 Roosevelt Hall
 Weighlock Building
 John Monro House
 Syracuse State School 
 Gridley Building
 Syracuse Savings Bank Building
 White Memorial Building
 Gere Bank Building
 Dan Bradley House
 John McViccar House
 Harvey Tolman House
 Junod House
 First Presbyterian Church of Marcellus
 Reuel E. Smith House
 Church of St. John the Evangelist (Syracuse, New York)
 St. John the Baptist Greek Catholic Church
 McCarthy Warehouse
 Grace Episcopal Church
 First Baptist Church of Camillus
 St. Mark's Episcopal Church 
 St. Paul's Episcopal Church
 Crouse College
 Alexander Brown House
 Martisco station
 Onondaga County Poor House
 Community Place 
 Hamilton White House
 Wesleyan Methodist Church
 Hall of Languages
 Lucius Gleason House
 Third Onondaga County Courthouse

Reception 
A review published in New York History praised the book as a "worthy volume" that would hopefully be the first of several surveys creating "unique collections" of commentary and images on New York's historic architecture. Upon publication, an article in The New York Times wrote that after sending out information on the report to various officials and programs, "[t]he response in replies ha[d] far exceeded the council's expectations." Ada Louise Huxtable considered the work a "significant pilot report" and described it as a "remarkably competent survey of buildings of architectural value and historical importance." Huxtable also hoped that the book would be the first of a series of several such projects in other American cities.

A 1975 article in Pioneer America by Peirce F. Lewis argued that "the historic preservation movement in the United States has been, and continues to be, a thundering failure." He noted that the book had gone out of print, "perhaps because it has become obsolete so many of the 'worth saving' buildings have been destroyed since the book was published, less than a dozen years ago." In a 1976 article Clifford E. Clark cited the book as one of the best studies of American domestic architecture.

References 

Architecture books
Historic sites in Onondaga County, New York